The Colfax Railroad Museum is a railroad museum in Colfax, Wisconsin.

Collection
The museum houses a collection of equipment from railroads that served western Wisconsin and eastern Minnesota. The collection includes Soo Line caboose number 273, Barney and Smith Car Company heavyweight coach number 991, and Soo Line GP30 number 703, and other cars.

The depot houses the large collection of railroad lanterns, railroad china, and the nation's largest railroad paperweight collection. Exhibits in the museum illustrate the items of material culture that people encountered in their day-to-day activities with the railroads and how technology changed over time.

Steam locomotives

Diesel locomotives

Passenger cars

Freight cars
Soo Line, Boxcar #36400

Cabooses
Milwaukee Road #X00127
Minneapolis, Northfield & Southern #018
Soo Line #256
Soo Line #273

MoW equipment
Canadian National Speeder #154-33

History

The museum is housed in the third depot to be built in the village.  Built from sandstone quarried nearby, this building was constructed between 1914 and 1915 on the foundation of the second depot, which had previously been moved off the site to serve as a personal residence.

In 1958, a large storm tore through western Wisconsin, producing many tornadoes, one of which hit the freighthouse on the depot's west side.  The wall of the women's waiting room was rebuilt from the rubble, but the freight house was never restored.

See also
List of museums in Wisconsin

References

External links 
 

Railroad museums in Wisconsin
Museums in Dunn County, Wisconsin